Jorge Iván Caicedo Rodríguez (born 12 August 1995), sometimes known as El Kaiser, is a Colombian footballer who plays as a defender for italy club US Vibonese Calcio.

Career

Minerva Punjab
Jorge Caceido made his professional debut in India, playing for Minerva Punjab in the
I-League.

Real Avilés CF
On 12 July 2019, he joined the Spanish side Real Avilés CF which plays in Tercera División.

Career statistics

Club

Notes

References

1995 births
Living people
Colombian footballers
Colombian expatriate footballers
Association football defenders
RoundGlass Punjab FC players
I-League players
Expatriate footballers in the Maldives
Expatriate footballers in India
Real Avilés CF footballers
Colombian expatriate sportspeople in Spain
Expatriate footballers in Spain
Colombian expatriate sportspeople in India